The 2005 Big 12 Conference women's basketball tournament, known for sponsorship reasons as the 2005 Phillips 66 Big 12 Women's Basketball Championship, was the 2005 edition of the Big 12 Conference's championship tournament.  The tournament was held at the Municipal Auditorium in Kansas City from 8 March until 12 March 2005.  The Quarterfinals, Semifinals, and Finals were televised on the ESPN family of networks. The championship game, held on March 12, 2005, featured the number 1 seeded Baylor Lady Bears, and the number 3 seeded Kansas State Wildcats. Baylor won the contest by a 68-55 margin.

Seeding

Schedule

Tournament bracket

All-Tournament team
Most Outstanding Player – Sophia Young, Baylor

See also
2005 Big 12 Conference men's basketball tournament
2005 NCAA Women's Division I Basketball Tournament
2004–05 NCAA Division I women's basketball rankings

References

Big 12 Conference women's basketball tournament
Tournament
Big 12 Conference women's basketball tournament
Big 12 Conference women's basketball tournament